Maurice FitzMaurice FitzGerald, 2nd Earl of Desmond (d. 1358) (Maurice Óg) was the son of Maurice FitzGerald, 1st Earl of Desmond, and his first wife, Catherine de Burgh. (Some sources list her as Margaret.)

The 2nd Earl married Beatrice de Stafford, daughter of Ralph de Stafford, 1st Earl of Stafford and Margaret Audley, but died at Castle Maine without any male issue, and was therefore succeeded in the Earldom of Desmond by his half-brother Gerald FitzGerald, 3rd Earl of Desmond. FitzGerald's widow married Thomas de Ros, 4th Baron de Ros around a year after FitzGerald's death. He was buried in Tralee Abbey.

Maurice
14th-century Irish people
1358 deaths
Normans in Ireland
Year of birth unknown
Earls of Desmond (1329 creation)